Sir Edward Montagu ( – 10 February 1557) of Boughton, Hanging Houghton and Hemington in Northamptonshire was an English lawyer and judge in the time of Henry VIII and Edward VI. He was Chief Justice of the King's Bench from 1539 to 1545 and Chief Justice of the Common Pleas from 1545 to 1553.

Life
He was born in or before 1488 at the royal manor house at Brigstock, Northamptonshire, the 2nd son of Thomas Montagu (d. 1517) of Hemington, and Agnes Dudley, daughter of William Dudley of Clopton, and Christiana Darrell. His grandfather, Richard Ladde, assumed the name of Montagu in about 1447.

Montagu was a student at Cambridge and was admitted to Middle Temple on 22 May 1506. He served as Autumn Reader for the Inn in 1524 and 1531. He was made Serjeant-at-law in 1531, King’s Serjeant in 1537 and was knighted on 18 October 1537. He was appointed Chief Justice of the King's Bench in 1539, which office he resigned in 1545 and was transferred to the "less onerous, but more profitable" post of Chief Justice of the Common Pleas. He was a member of the Privy Council of Henry VIII, who appointed him one of sixteen executors of his last will, and governor to his son Edward. During the crisis of 1553 when Edward VI wished to alter the succession in favour of Lady Jane Grey, Montagu protested at the illegality of the proceedings. However, when the Duke of Northumberland called him a traitor and threatened him with physical violence, he withdrew his protest. He was imprisoned in the Tower of London on Mary's accession but bought his way out.

In 1528 he purchased the manor of Boughton, near Kettering, Northamptonshire and built the family seat of Boughton House on the site.

Marriages and children
Montagu married three times:
 First, Cicely Lane, of Orlingbury by whom he had three sons who all died young, and three daughters:
Ralph Montagu,
Thomas Montagu
Robert Montagu
Dorothy Montagu, the eldest daughter, married, in 1535, Edward Watson (d. 1584) of Rockingham Castle, the son of Edward Watson (d. 1530) of Lyddington, Rutland and Emma Smith. After the death of his father in 1530 Watson became a ward of Thomas Cromwell, was educated and later employed by the minister. Edward and Dorothy had a son and six daughters, including:
Sir Edward Watson (c. 1549 – 1617) married, in April 1567, Anne Digby (d. 1612), daughter of Kenelm Digby of Stoke Dry, Rutland. They had two sons and eight daughters, including:
Lewis Watson, 1st Baron Rockingham (1584 – 1653)
Catherine Watson married Arthur Brooke of Great Oakley.
Mary Watson
Elizabeth Watson married Thomas Furtho of Furtho, Northamptonshire.
Ellen Watson married George Flower.
Anne Watson
Emma Watson
Anne Montagu, married John Rowse of Rows Linch, Worcestershire
Amey Montagu, married George Linne of Southwick, Northamptonshire.
 Second, Agnes Kirkham, daughter George Kirkham (d. 1527) of Warmington, by whom he had no children.
 Third, Eleanor Roper (d. 1563), daughter of John Roper (d. 1524), of Well Hall, chief clerk of the king's bench and attorney-general to Henry VIII, widow of John Moreton, by whom he had eleven children (five sons and six daughters):
Edward Montagu (1532–1602), his eldest surviving son, was father of eight sons and four daughters, including:
Edward Montagu, 1st Baron Montagu of Boughton, ancestor of the Dukes of Montagu 
Henry Montagu, 1st Earl of Manchester, ancestor of the Earls of Halifax
Charles Montagu (of Boughton), MP
James Montagu, Bishop of Winchester
Sir Sidney Montagu, MP, ancestor of the Earls of Sandwich
Roger Montagu
Simon Montagu
Thomas Montagu
William Montagu
Elizabeth Montagu, married 1. Richard Cave, son and heir of Sir Thomas Cave of Stanford, Northamptonshire; 2. William Markham of Oakley, Northamptonshire.
Eleanor Montagu, married George Tirrell of Thornton, Buckinghamshire.
Isabel Montagu, married Bryan Lasscells of Gateford, Nottinghamshire.
Mary Montagu, married William Wattes of Blakesley, Northamptonshire.
Margaret Montagu, married Robert Woode of Colwick, Nottinghamshire
Agnes, died unmarried.

Gallery

Death
He died at Boughton 10 February 1557 and was buried 5 March with much pomp (including a "hearse of wax") in the church of St Mary, Weekley, where there is an altar tomb with his full-length effigy in robes and collar of SS and the motto "Pour unge pleasoir mille dolours" ("For every pleasure, a thousand sorrows"). His widow married as her third husband, Sir John Digby. She died in May 1563.

See also
Boughton House
Coleridge Collar

References

Sources

External links

Monument of Sir Edward Montagu, St Mary's Church, Weekley Flickr
Boughton House

1488 births
1557 deaths

Year of birth uncertain
Edward Montagu
People from North Northamptonshire
Lord chief justices of England and Wales
16th-century English judges